The Bloc (stylized as THE BLOC), formerly Macy's Plaza and Broadway Plaza, is an open-air shopping center in downtown Los Angeles at 700 South Flower Street, in the Financial District. Its tenants include the downtown Los Angeles Macy's store, LA Fitness, Nordstrom Local, UNIQLO, and the Sheraton Grand Los Angeles hotel. The shopping center has its own entrance to the 7th Street/Metro Center station of the Los Angeles Metro Rail system. This shopping square is a vibrant, open-air urban center, a growing, inclusive community in the heart of downtown Los Angeles, which Encompassing a full city block along LA’s iconic 7th Street corridor, The Bloc tends to connect the financial, fashion, jewelry, and theater districts and the 7th Street Metro Center Station, meaning where four Downtown Los Angeles lines converge more.

History

The Original Broadway Plaza (1973–2013) 

The original Broadway Plaza opened as an enclosed shopping mall in 1973. The structure claimed to be the first enclosed "suburban" type shopping center in a downtown area in the United States. The original enclosed mall included the downtown The Broadway store, the Hyatt Regency Los Angeles, and an Oshman's Sporting Goods, along with an underground food court and several smaller non-chain shops.

The mall was renamed Macy's Plaza in 1996 due to the bankruptcy of The Broadway chain being bought out by Macy's. In 2005, the Hyatt Regency was renamed the Sheraton Los Angeles Downtown. Bally Total Fitness (which occupied the Oshman's space) closed and re-opened as LA Fitness in 2012. In 2013, Macy's Plaza was acquired by Ratkovich, who developed plans to replace the imposing 1973-vintage "monolithic" red brick fortress-like architectural style, with a more open plan.

Renovation (2015) 

A majority of the Macy's Plaza closed in early-2015 for the conversion into a new open-air plaza, given the name The Bloc. The renovation forced many long-time tenants, including Bath and Body Works, Express, Lady Foot Locker, Victoria's Secret, and original 1973 opening tenant Carl's Jr. in the underground food court to close. Many of these tenants, including Victoria's Secret and Bath and Body Works, moved to the nearby newly-renovated FIGat7th outdoor mall. LA Fitness, Macy's, and the Sheraton hotel remained open during the renovations. LA Fitness and the United States Postal Service branch at the mall remained operational but were forced to move to street level. In May 2015, the large "Macy's" sign was taken down and the large glass atrium roof was removed, officially opening the atrium of the once enclosed mall to the sky.

The New Outdoor-Plaza 

The Bloc Los Angeles was officially opened in October 2015.  By design, the outdoor plaza was the first development in the Los Angeles area to have its own access to the LA Metro (as was planned when the subway line was constructed under Flower Street in 1989).  The new plaza contains Los Angeles' first Alamo Drafthouse Cinema, an Austin-based movie theatre chain, and Starbucks Evenings, a Starbucks store concept that serves alcoholic beverages, along with a Macy's flagship store, GNC, and LA Fitness. Other restaurants include Hatch, Urban Oven, CoffeeWalk YogurTalk, Everytable and District DTLA. In 2016, following a renovation, the Sheraton Los Angeles Downtown was renamed the Sheraton Grand Los Angeles. Due to delays in construction, The Bloc for a while had trouble finding tenants, but once Alamo Drafthouse officially signed their lease, more tenants started signing leases. The Bloc now has 60 percent of the office spaces leased and 76 percent of the retail space leased.

Since in 2017, much of these pop=up stores continue to open in this shopping complex after the renovation. In the slight past, that includes Joachim Splichal’s wine, All Flavor on Melrose, Yorkshire Square Brewing, and even Tony’s Darts Away, with then, this center has been transformed into walkable, indoor-outdoor mall akin to the nearby FIGat7th or condensed version of Americana at Brand.

In 2018, retailer Uniqlo opened its store in Downtown LA.

Proposed Residential Tower
A 53 story, 710 foot tall tower addition was proposed above the parking podium in 2021. Currently through the planning phase.

References

External links
 

Shopping malls in Central Los Angeles
Buildings and structures in Downtown Los Angeles
Commercial buildings completed in 1973
Downtown Los Angeles
Shopping malls established in 2015